Siarhei Viktaravich Kalamoyets (born 11 August 1989) is a Belarusian athlete specialising in the hammer throw. He won the bronze medal at the 2015 Summer Universiade. His personal best in the event is 77.52 metres set in Minsk in 2011.

Competition record

References

1989 births
Living people
Belarusian male hammer throwers
Sportspeople from Grodno
Athletes (track and field) at the 2016 Summer Olympics
Olympic athletes of Belarus
Universiade medalists in athletics (track and field)
Universiade bronze medalists for Belarus
Competitors at the 2011 Summer Universiade
Competitors at the 2013 Summer Universiade
Medalists at the 2015 Summer Universiade